Louis "Lou" Amato (born 1963) is an Australian politician. He has been a Liberal member of the New South Wales Legislative Council since the 2015 state election.

Immediately prior to his election to the NSW Parliament, he served as a Councillor and Deputy Mayor of the Wollondilly Shire Council.

References

 

1963 births
Living people
Members of the New South Wales Legislative Council
Liberal Party of Australia members of the Parliament of New South Wales
Australian politicians of Italian descent
21st-century Australian politicians